Central Field may refer to:
 Central Field (Central State), former home of the Central State College Bronchos football team, now the University of Central Oklahoma
 Central Field (Iwo Jima), a World War II airfield on Iwo Jima, Japan
 Central Field, Giza, an archaeological site in Egypt

See also 
 Central field approximation